Maenaddwyn is a village in Anglesey, in north-west Wales.

References

Other websites 

 

Villages in Anglesey
Llanddyfnan